Çubukspor Futbol AŞ (formerly Gölbaşıspor) is a football club located in Çubuk in Ankara.

History
The team was founded as a sport organisation of Agriculture Ministry and named Ankara Köy Hizmetleri SK. Recent years the team changed its name again and took the name of Tarım Kredi SKD. At the start of the 2008–2009 season, it was called that the team, would move to Ankara's growing neighbourhood Pursaklar which had no sports organisation. After breaking the relations with the Ministry, Pursaklar SK is managed by Municipality of Pursaklar. Despite moving outside the city, Pursaklar SK still plays its home games at Cebeci İnönü Stadı. Finally they renamed their names as Kızılcahamamspor after moving to Kızılcahamam district in 2011.  The team recently rebranded themselves as Gölbaşıspor A.Ş. prior to the start of the 2014–15 TFF Second League.

References

External links
 Facebook
 Çubukspor on TFF.org

Association football clubs established in 1977
Football clubs in Turkey